Thailand competed at the 1992 Summer Olympics in Barcelona, Spain.

Medalists

Competitors
The following is the list of number of competitors in the Games.

Results by event

Athletics
Men's 100m metres
Visut Watanasin 
 Heat — 10.72 (→ did not advance)

Men's 200 metres
Seaksarn Boonrat

Men's 400 metres
Aktawat Sakoolchan

Men's 4 × 100 m Relay
Kriengkrai Narom, Seaksarn Boonrat, Niti Piyapan, and Visut Watanasin

Men's 4 × 400 m Relay
Athiaporn Koonjartong, Yuthana Thonglek, Sarapong Kumsup, and Aktawat Sakoolchan
 Heat — 3:08.00 (→ did not advance)

Men's 400m Hurdles
Chanond Kenchan
 Heat — 50.60 (→ did not advance)

Women's 100 metres
Ratjai Sripet

Women's 200 metres
Nednapa Chommuak

Women's 400 metres
Noodang Phimphoo

Women's 4 × 100 m Relay
Nednapa Chommuak, Reawadee Srithoa, Ratjai Sripet, and Pornpim Srisurat

Women's 4 × 400 m Relay
Saleerat Srimek, Sukanya Sang-Nguen, Srirat Chimrak, and Noodang Phimphoo

Women's 800 metres
Sukanya Sang-Ngeun
 Heat — 2:09.94 (→ did not advance)

Women's 400m Hurdles
Reawadee Srithoa
 Heat — 58.80 (→ did not advance)

Women's High Jump
 Jaruwan Jenjudkarn 
 Qualification — 1.75 m (→ did not advance)

Badminton

Men

Women

Boxing

Judo
Women's Lightweight
 Prateep Pinitwong

Women's Heavyweight
 Supatra Yompakdee

Sailing
Men's Sailboard (Lechner A-390)
Saard Panyawan
 Final ranking — 241.0 points (→ 26th place)

Women's Sailboard (Lechner A-390)
Amara Wichithong
 Final ranking — 215.0 points (→ 20th place)

Shooting
Men's Air Rifle (10 metres)
Samarn Jongsuk

Women's Sporting Pistol (25 metres)
Rampai Yamfang-Sriyai

Swimming
Men's 400m Freestyle
 Ratapong Sirisanont
 Heat — 4:07.95 (→ did not advance, 39th place)

Men's 1500m Freestyle
 Ratapong Sirisanont
 Heat — 16:08.02 (→ did not advance, 27th place)

Men's 200m Individual Medley
 Ratapong Sirisanont
 Heat — 2:11.02 (→ did not advance, 39th place)

Men's 400m Individual Medley
 Ratapong Sirisanont
 Heat — 4:37.95 (→ did not advance, 39th place)

Women's 50m Freestyle
 Ratiporn Wong
 Heat — 28.42 (→ did not advance, 44th place)

Women's 100m Freestyle
 Ratiporn Wong
 Heat — 1:00.85 (→ did not advance, 43rd place)

Women's 400m Freestyle
 Thanya Sridama
 Heat — 4:29.64 (→ did not advance, 27th place)

Women's 800m Freestyle
 Thanya Sridama
 Heat — 9:10.58 (→ did not advance, 23rd place)

Women's 200m Backstroke
 Praphalsai Minpraphal
 Heat — 2:26.32 (→ did not advance, 42nd place)

Women's 100m Breaststroke
 Sornsawan Phuvichit
 Heat — 1:14.69 (→ did not advance, 31st place)

Women's 200m Breaststroke
 Sornsawan Phuvichit
 Heat — 2:41.20 (→ did not advance, 30th place)

Women's 100m Butterfly
 Praphalsai Minpraphal
 Heat — 1:04.28 (→ did not advance, 37th place)

Women's 200m Butterfly
 Praphalsai Minpraphal
 Heat — 2:20.48 (→ did not advance, 25th place)

Women's 200m Individual Medley
 Praphalsai Minpraphal
 Heat — 2:23.24 (→ did not advance, 30th place)

Women's 400m Individual Medley
 Praphalsai Minpraphal
 Heat — 5:04.95 (→ did not advance, 28th place)

Tennis
Women's doubles
Suvimol Duangchan and Benjamas Sangaram

Weightlifting
Men's Light-Heavyweight
Prasert Sumpradit

References

Official Olympic Reports
International Olympic Committee results database
sports-reference

Nations at the 1992 Summer Olympics
1992
Summer Olympics